Nankin is a rural locality in the Livingstone Shire, Queensland, Australia. In the  Nankin had a population of 170 people.

Geography 
The now-closed Emu Park railway line entered the locality from the west (Nerimbera) and exits to the north. Four now-abandoned stations served the locality:

 Nankin Junction railway station
Leaholme railway station
Coolcorra railway station
 Sleipner Junction railway station
The now-closed branch line to Broadmount separated from the Emu Park railway line at Nankin Junction and travelled to the south-west (now Thompson Point) through the following abandoned railway stations within the locality (from west to east):

 Crescent View railway station (approx )
 Meadows railway station (approx )
 Balnagowan railway station (approx )

The Rockhampton–Emu Park Road runs through from south-west to north-west.

History 
Nankin Junction Provisional School opened in 1899. On 1 January 1909 it became Nankin Junction State School. It closed circa 1940.

In the  Nankin had a population of 170 people.

References 

Shire of Livingstone
Localities in Queensland